South Esk is a small community in Northumberland County, New Brunswick, located in Southesk Parish near Miramichi on Route 420.

History

Notable people

See also
List of communities in New Brunswick

Communities in Northumberland County, New Brunswick